The Hungerford railway station is a railway station that serves the town of Hungerford in Berkshire, England.

The station, and all trains serving it, are operated by Great Western Railway.

History
The Great Western Railway opened the station in 1847 as a temporary terminus of the Berks and Hants Line which started at Reading. It eventually reached Taunton on 2 April 1906 to allow the running of express trains from  through to the south west without taking the longer route through Bristol. The station ceased to deal with goods traffic in 1970, and became an unstaffed halt with subsequent demolition of the station buildings (except the 1902 footbridge over the lines) in 1971. The footbridge was replaced by the current modern structure in 1999. A freight train crashed on 10 November 1971 partially demolishing the GWR signal box, which was then replaced by a modern wooden flat roofed signal box which served until the end of semaphore signalling and the introduction of colour light signals on 17 July 1978.

Service history
The station remained part of the Great Western Railway until the nationalisation of the railways in 1948. After the sectorisation of British Rail in 1982 the station became part of Network SouthEast. Services were provided by Thames Trains from 1996, from 2004 by First Great Western Link and from 2006 by First Great Western.

Current layout
Hungerford station consists of two platforms either side of the mainline tracks. There is a level crossing at the western end of the station. One mile east of the station there is a passing loop on the up line, which is mainly used by freight trains but can also be used by passenger trains. The current timetable does not call for passenger trains to use the loop but it is common for special charter trains to do so.

Hungerford station is on the eastern side of the town. The Kennet and Avon Canal runs to the north of the station, parallel with the line.

Services

It is also served by semi-fast Great Western Railway trains between London and  using Class 800 and Class 802 trains.

The services are summarised as follows:

References

External links

Railway stations in Berkshire
DfT Category F1 stations
Former Great Western Railway stations
Railway stations in Great Britain opened in 1847
Railway stations served by Great Western Railway
1862 establishments in England
Hungerford